The Elf (Electric Low Floor) is an electric multiple unit developed by Polish rolling-stock manufacturer Pesa SA. It is based on earlier EMU designs named ED59 and ED74. A Pesa Elf was exhibited at InnoTrans 2010.

In 2016 a new version, Elf 2, was introduced, featuring new design. In 2019, Elf.eu – a multisystem version targeting EU markets – was introduced.

Operators

References

External links

 Pesa Elf

Electric multiple units of Poland
PESA SA

3000 V DC multiple units
25 kV AC multiple units